The Vice-President of the Executive Council is the minister in the Government of Australia who acts as the presiding officer of meetings of the Federal Executive Council when the Governor-General is absent. The Vice-President of the Executive Council is appointed by the Governor-General on the advice of the Prime Minister of Australia, and serves at the Governor-General's pleasure. The Vice-President is usually a senior minister in Cabinet, who may summon executive councillors and preside at council meetings when the Governor-General is not present. However, the Vice-President cannot sign Executive Council documents on behalf of the Governor-General.

The current Vice President of the Executive Council is Senator Katy Gallagher, who was appointed on 23 May 2022.

Duties and history
The duties of the Vice-President of the Executive Council are not rigorous, and the position is usually held by a Member of the Cabinet, who is not paid additional salary or allowance. 

The position is usually not held by a 'Minister without portfolio', but the position has at times been held by persons who did not hold a Ministerial portfolio—such as Enid Lyons (1949–1951) in the Fourth Menzies Ministry and James Killen (1982–1983) in the Third Fraser Ministry. A small Department of the Vice-President of the Executive Council existed from 22 March to 31 May 1971, during the prime ministership of William McMahon. It was administered by Alan Hulme, who was also Postmaster-General. The department was recreated in 1982 and James Killen was controversially appointed to administer the office. Killen held no other Ministerial portfolio, but was nevertheless considered a member of the Fraser Ministry by virtue only of this office. The appointment was controversial because it was seen as a sinecure given that Killen held no Ministerial portfolio, as the cabinet appointment entitled him to receive a ministerial salary. The Department was again abolished in 1983 by incoming Prime Minister Bob Hawke.

During the Turnbull Government in 2015, the Leader of the Government in the Senate has been the Vice-President. This practice was continued by the Morrison Government. Under the Albanese Government, the roles are separated though the Vice-President remains a senator.

Colonial and state governments
Prior to the creation of the Commonwealth of Australia in 1901, colonial and state governments also appointed a Vice-President of the Executive Council, and some have kept the title. The Colony of New South Wales was the first to appoint a Vice-President of the Executive Council (New South Wales), on 3 October 1856, in the Parker ministry of the first elected colonial government. The New South Wales government currently retains the title for a senior government minister, who since 30 October 2020 has been Damien Tudehope, Leader of the Government in the Legislative Council.

The Executive Council of Victoria is made up of the Premier and his or her Ministers who have been sworn into that office by the Governor, usually immediately after they have been sworn in as Ministers. While not a member, the Governor usually attends and presides at meetings of the Executive Council.

List of vice-presidents
The following individuals have been appointed as Vice-President of the Executive Council:

References

Lists of government ministers of Australia